Bobby Vardaro is an American football Guard who is currently a free agent. He played college football at Boston College. He was signed by the Vikings as an undrafted free agent in 2015.

Early years
Vardaro attended Phillips Academy Andover in Andover, Massachusetts, where he was a two-time Eagle-Tribune all-star as an offensive lineman, playing both nose guard and offensive tackle for the Big Blue for head coach Leon Modeste. As a senior, he earned NEPSAC All-New England Class A honors.

Vardaro also competed on the school's track & field team; he won the shot put (53 feet, 7 inches or 16.38m) and discus (119 feet, 8 inches or 36.50m) events at the 2010 New England Class A Prep School meet.

Professional career

Vardaro did not hear his name called during the 2015 NFL Draft, but signed with the Minnesota Vikings as an undrafted free agent shortly after the draft.

References

External links
Bobby Vardaro

1991 births
Living people
American football offensive guards
Boston College Eagles football players
Minnesota Vikings players
Players of American football from Massachusetts
People from North Reading, Massachusetts
Sportspeople from Middlesex County, Massachusetts